Zhang Yujian (born February 9, 1990)  is a Chinese actor.

Biography 
Zhang first appeared in Mayday's musical film May Day Chase Dream 3DNA in 2011 and was remembered for his role as a delivery boy.

Zhang first gained recognition with his role as Wang Kai's subordinate in the historical drama Nirvana in Fire. He then gained increased recognition with his performances in the fantasy drama Ice Fantasy and crime drama Yu Zui in 2016.

In 2018, Zhang starred in the fantasy action drama An Oriental Odyssey. He received positive reviews for his role as a detective.

In 2019, Zhang starred as the male lead in the romance web series Le Coup de Foudre, reuniting with An Oriental Odyssey co-star Janice Wu. The same year, he starred in the romance comedy drama Please Love Me as a top singer. 

In 2021, it was confirmed that Zhang Yujian and his Le Coup de Foudre co-star, Janice Wu are married and have a child together.

Filmography

Film

Television series

Television show

Awards and nominations

References 

1990 births
Living people
People from Binzhou
Male actors from Shandong
21st-century Chinese male actors
Shanghai Theatre Academy alumni
Chinese male film actors
Chinese male television actors